Jan Kudrna (born July 1, 1975) is a Czech former professional ice hockey defenceman.

Kudrna played in the Czech Extraliga for HC Bílí Tygři Liberec, HC Karlovy Vary and HC Oceláři Třinec. He also played in the Tipsport Liga for MsHK Žilina and HK Nitra and in the Ligue Magnus for Rapaces de Gap.

Kudrna began and ended his career with IHC Písek and later became an assistant coach for the team after his retirement.

References

External links

1975 births
Living people
HC Bílí Tygři Liberec players
Czech ice hockey defencemen
HC Karlovy Vary players
HK Nitra players
HC Oceláři Třinec players
IHC Písek players
Rapaces de Gap players
HC Slovan Ústečtí Lvi players
HC Tábor players
MsHK Žilina players
Czech expatriate ice hockey players in Slovakia
Expatriate ice hockey players in France
Czech expatriate sportspeople in France